Simo Lipsanen (born 13 September 1995 in Lappeenranta) is a Finnish athlete specialising in the triple jump. He represented his country at the 2017 World Championships without reaching the final.

His personal bests in the event are 17.14 metres outdoors (-0.5 m/s, Bydgoszcz 2017) and 16.84 metres indoors (Belgrade 2017). Both are current national records.

International competitions

References

1995 births
Living people
Finnish male triple jumpers
World Athletics Championships athletes for Finland
People from Lappeenranta
Finnish Athletics Championships winners
Sportspeople from South Karelia